This is a list of electricity-generating power stations in the U.S. state of Washington, sorted by type and name. These include facilities that are located in more than one state. In 2020, Washington had a total summer capacity of 30,669 MW through all of its power plants, and a net generation of 116,114 GWh. The corresponding electrical energy generation mix in 2021 was 64.6% hydroelectric, 14.4% natural gas, 7.8% nuclear, 2.9% coal, 8.7% wind, and 1.3% biomass which includes most refuse-derived fuel. Petroleum and utility-scale solar facilities generated most of the remaining 0.3%. Small-scale photovoltaic installations generated an additional net 311 GWh to the state's electrical grid; an amount six times larger than Washington's utility-scale photovoltaic plants.

Washington routinely delivers one-quarter of U.S. hydroelectric generation, and hosts the nation's largest capacity power station at Grand Coulee Dam. 60% of Washington households use electricity as their primary heating fuel, unlike most households in other U.S. states that typically utilize natural gas.

Nuclear power stations

Fossil-fuel power stations
Data from the U.S. Energy Information Administration serves as a general reference.

Renewable power stations
Data from the U.S. Energy Information Administration serves as a general reference.

Hydroelectric

Wind

Solar

Municipal Solid Waste (MSW) Combustion

Former facilities

See also

List of power stations in the United States

References

External links
Renewable Northwest Project: Renewable Energy Projects

 
Lists of buildings and structures in Washington (state)
Geographic coordinate lists
Washington